The 5th Canadian Parliament was in session from 8 February 1883, until 15 January 1887. The membership was set by the 1882 federal election on 20 June 1882. It was dissolved prior to the 1887 election. The 5th Canadian Parliament was controlled by a Conservative/Liberal-Conservative majority under Prime Minister Sir John A. Macdonald and the 3rd Canadian Ministry. The Official Opposition was the Liberal Party, led by Edward Blake.

The Speaker was George Airey Kirkpatrick. See also List of Canadian electoral districts 1882-1887 for a list of the ridings in this parliament.

There were four sessions of the 5th Parliament:

Notable legislation
This term was notable for passing the Chinese Immigration Act of 1885 which imposed a head tax on Chinese immigrants to Canada.

List of members

Following is a full list of members of the fifth Parliament listed first by province, then by electoral district.

Electoral districts denoted by an asterisk (*) indicates that district was represented by two members.

British Columbia

Manitoba

New Brunswick

Nova Scotia

Ontario

Prince Edward Island

Quebec

By-elections

References

05th Canadian parliament
1883 establishments in Canada
1887 disestablishments in Canada
1883 in Canada
1884 in Canada
1885 in Canada
1886 in Canada
1887 in Canada